Birgitte Elisabeth Andersen (née Olsen) (17 December 1791 – 6 February 1875) was a Danish stage actor and ballet dancer.

Daughter of Iver Olsen, controller at the Royal Danish Theatre in Copenhagen. Student of  Antoine Bournonville at the ballet school from 1801. In 1804, she became one of the first students at the newly founded drama school Den Kgl. Dramatiske Skole, and was considered as the most notable talent the school produced. She debuted at the royal court theatre, Hofteatret, in 1806 and at the Royal Danish Theatre in 1808, and was contracted in 1810. She was described as beautiful, intelligent, cold, with a gift for irony. She was deemed as most suitable for solemn roles, but was criticized for a certain stiffness. She was the first Dane to play Portia (1828), Ofelia (1813) and Schiller's Jeanne d'Arc (1819). She retired with a full royal pension in 1838.

She married the conductor of the Royal Danish Orchestra, Caspar Heinrich Bernhard Andersen, in 1815.

References 

1791 births
1875 deaths
Danish stage actresses
19th-century Danish actresses
19th-century Danish ballet dancers